Entrada Baker Airport ,  is an airstrip  east of Cochrane, in the Aysén Region of Chile.

The airstrip is in a mountain valley  from the Argentina border. There is mountainous terrain in all quadrants.

See also

Transport in Chile
List of airports in Chile

References

External links
OpenStreetMap - Entrada Baker Airport
OurAirports - Entrada Baker Airport
FallingRain - Entrada Baker Airport

Airports in Aysén Region